The 1996 Dimapur car bombing occurred on 25 December 1996, when the NSCN-IM detonated a powerful car bomb triggered from remote control in the Ara Mile neighbourhood of Dimapur, Nagaland in an attempted assassination on Kihoto Hollohon, the then Minister of Industries & Commerce of Nagaland. Hollohon escaped as he was not in the vehicle. The blast killed his wife, daughter, granddaughter, grandson and one other on spot.

Incident 
On 25 December 1996, the NSCN-IM triggered car bomb from remote control in an assassination attempt on Hollohon and his family while they were returning home from a Christmas service in the Ara Mile neighbourhood of Dimapur.

Hollohon escaped as he was not in the vehicle at that time. The vehicle, a Maruti Suzuki Gypsy, in which his wife Vitoli, daughter Nishela, grand-daughter Hollotoli and grand-son Ninoto (2 year old) and one other were seated exploded killing everyone on the spot.

See also 
 2004 Dimapur bombings

References

Failed assassination attempts in Asia
 1996 in Nagaland